Andreas Aagaard Kiønig (8 August 1771 – 1 March 1856) was a Norwegian lawyer and  judge . He served as a representative at the Norwegian Constitutional Assembly.

Andreas Aagaard Kiønig  was born on Opaker Gård at Grue in Hedmark,  Norway. He graduated as cand.jur. in 1790.

He was elected to the Norwegian Constituent Assembly in 1814, representing the constituency of Hedemarkens Amt. He supported the  independence party (Selvstendighetspartiet). At that time he worked as a district stipendiary magistrate (sorenskriver) in the traditional district 
of Østerdalen.

He was then appointed Supreme Court Assessor the same year. In 1836, when appointment of a new Chief Justice was due, Kiønig was a candidate, but the position was given to Georg Jacob Bull. As a result, Kiønig retired as a Supreme Court Assessor. Kiønig was honorably discharged from civil service in 1837 and retired to Opsal søndre in the parish of Elverum in Hedmark.

References

1771 births
1856 deaths
18th-century Norwegian lawyers
Norwegian civil servants
People from Grue, Norway
Fathers of the Constitution of Norway
Hedmark politicians
Supreme Court of Norway justices
19th-century Norwegian lawyers